Aquatic means relating to water; living in or near water or taking place in water; does not include groundwater, as "aquatic" implies an environment where plants and animals live.

Aquatic(s) may also refer to:

 Aquatic animal, either vertebrate or invertebrate, which lives in water for most or all of its life
 Aquatic ecosystem, environmental system located in a body of water
 Aquatic plants, also called hydrophytic plants or hydrophytes, are plants that have adapted to living in or on aquatic environments
 Aquatic (album), 1994 album by the Australian experimental jazz trio, The Necks
 Aquatics, another name for water sports

See also
 
 Aquatics (disambiguation)
 Freshwater ecosystem, an earth aquatic ecosystems
 Limnology, the study of inland waters
 Marine biology, the scientific study of organisms in the ocean or other marine or brackish bodies of water
 Oceanography, the study of marine environments

sv:Vatten#Vattnets biologiska roll